William Tyndale (sometimes spelled Tynsdale, Tindall, Tindill, Tyndall;  – ) was an English biblical scholar and linguist who became a leading figure in the Protestant Reformation in the years leading up to his execution. He is well known as a translator of the Bible into English, and was influenced by the works of prominent Protestant Reformers such as Martin Luther.

Luther's translation of the Christian Bible into German appeared in 1522. Tyndale's translation was the first English Bible to draw directly from Hebrew and Greek texts, the first English translation to take advantage of the printing press, the first of the new English Bibles of the Reformation, and the first English translation to use Jehovah ("Iehouah") as God's name as preferred by English Protestant Reformers. It was taken to be a direct challenge to the hegemony both of the Catholic Church and of those laws of England maintaining the church's position. The work of Tyndale continued to play a key role in spreading Reformation ideas across the English-speaking world and eventually across the British Empire.

Tyndale's translation of the Bible was used for subsequent English translations, including the Great Bible and the Bishops' Bible, authorized by the Church of England. In 1611, after seven years of work, the 47 scholars who produced the King James Version drew extensively from Tyndale's original work and other translations that descended from his. One estimate suggests that the New Testament in the King James Version is 83% Tyndale's words and the Old Testament 76%.

A copy of Tyndale's The Obedience of a Christian Man (1528), which some claim or interpret to argue for Caesaropapism: the idea that the Monarch should control the country's church rather than the Pope, came to the hands of King Henry VIII, providing a rationalization for breaking the Church in England from the Catholic Church in 1534. In 1530, Tyndale wrote The Practice of Prelates, opposing Henry's plan to seek the annulment of his marriage on the grounds that it contravened scripture. Fleeing England, Tyndale sought refuge in the Flemish territory of the Catholic Charles V, Holy Roman Emperor. 

In 1535 Tyndale was arrested, and jailed in the castle of Vilvoorde (Filford) outside Brussels for over a year. In 1536 he was convicted of heresy and executed by strangulation, after which his body was burnt at the stake. 

In 2002, Tyndale was placed 26th in the BBC's poll of the 100 Greatest Britons.

Background 
Partial English translations had been made from the 7th century onwards, but the religious foment caused by Wycliffe's Bible in the late 14th century led to the death penalty for anyone found guilty of unlicensed possession of an English translation of the Bible, although translations were available in all other major European languages. Tyndale lived and worked during the era of Renaissance humanism and the revival of Biblical scholarship, which were both aided by both the Gutenberg Revolution and the ensuing democratisation of knowledge; for example, the publication of Johann Reuchlin's Hebrew grammar in 1506. Classical and Koine Greek texts became widely available to the European scholarly community for the first time in centuries, as it welcomed Greek-speaking scholars, philosophers, intellectuals, and the manuscripts they carried to Catholic Europe as refugees following the fall of Constantinople in 1453. Notably, Erasmus compiled, edited, and published the Koine Greek scriptures of the Christian Bible in 1516.

Life
Tyndale was born around 1494 in Melksham Court, Stinchcombe, a village near Dursley, Gloucestershire. The Tyndale family also went by the name Hychyns (Hitchins), and it was as William Hychyns that Tyndale was enrolled at Magdalen Hall, Oxford. Tyndale's family had moved to Gloucestershire at some point in the 15th century, probably as a result of the Wars of the Roses. The family originated from Northumberland via East Anglia. Tyndale's brother Edward was receiver to the lands of Lord Berkeley, as attested to in a letter by Bishop Stokesley of London. 

Tyndale is recorded in two genealogies as having been the brother of Sir William Tyndale of Deane, Northumberland, and Hockwold, Norfolk, who was knighted at the marriage of Arthur, Prince of Wales to Catherine of Aragon. Tyndale's family was thus descended from Baron Adam de Tyndale, a tenant-in-chief of Henry I. William Tyndale's niece Margaret Tyndale was married to Protestant martyr Rowland Taylor, burnt during the Marian Persecutions.

At Oxford
Tyndale began a Bachelor of Arts degree at Magdalen Hall (later Hertford College) of Oxford University in 1506 and received his B.A. in 1512, the same year becoming a subdeacon. He was made Master of Arts in July 1515 and was held to be a man of virtuous disposition, leading an unblemished life. The M.A. allowed him to start studying theology, but the official course did not include the systematic study of scripture. As Tyndale later complained:

He was a gifted linguist and became fluent over the years in French, Greek, Hebrew, German, Italian, Latin, and Spanish, in addition to English. Between 1517 and 1521, he went to the University of Cambridge. Erasmus had been the leading teacher of Greek there from August 1511 to January 1512, but not during Tyndale's time at the university.

Tyndale became chaplain at the home of Sir John Walsh at Little Sodbury in Gloucestershire and tutor to his children around 1521. His opinions proved controversial to fellow clergymen, and the next year he was summoned before John Bell, the Chancellor of the Diocese of Worcester, although no formal charges were laid at the time. After the meeting with Bell and other church leaders, Tyndale, according to John Foxe, had an argument with a "learned but blasphemous clergyman", who allegedly asserted: "We had better be without God's laws than the Pope's", to which Tyndale responded: "I defy the Pope and all his laws; and if God spares my life, ere many years, I will cause the boy that driveth the plow to know more of the Scriptures than thou dost!"

Tyndale left for London in 1523 to seek permission to translate the Bible into English. He requested help from Bishop Cuthbert Tunstall, a well-known classicist who had praised Erasmus after working together with him on a Greek New Testament. The bishop, however, declined to extend his patronage, telling Tyndale that he had no room for him in his household. Tyndale preached and studied "at his book" in London for some time, relying on the help of cloth merchant Humphrey Monmouth. During this time, he lectured widely, including at St Dunstan-in-the-West at Fleet Street in London.

In Europe

Tyndale left England for continental Europe, perhaps at Hamburg, in the spring of 1524, possibly traveling on to Wittenberg. There is an entry in the matriculation registers of the University of Wittenberg of the name "Guillelmus Daltici ex Anglia", and this has been taken to be a Latinisation of "William Tyndale from England". He began translating the New Testament at this time, possibly in Wittenberg, completing it in 1525 with assistance from Observant Friar William Roy.

In 1525 the publication of the work by Peter Quentell in Cologne was interrupted by the impact of anti-Lutheranism. A full edition of the New Testament was produced in 1526 by printer Peter Schöffer the Younger in Worms, a free imperial city then in the process of adopting Lutheranism. More copies were soon printed in Antwerp. It was smuggled from continental Europe into England and Scotland. The translation was condemned in October 1526 by Bishop Tunstall, who issued warnings to booksellers and had copies burned in public. Marius notes that the "spectacle of the scriptures being put to the torch... provoked controversy even amongst the faithful." Cardinal Wolsey condemned Tyndale as a heretic, first stated in open court in January 1529.

From an entry in George Spalatin's diary for 11 August 1526, Tyndale remained at Worms for about a year. It is not clear exactly when he moved to Antwerp. Here he stayed at the house of Thomas Poyntz. The colophon to Tyndale's translation of Genesis and the title pages of several pamphlets from this time purported to have been printed by Hans Lufft at Marburg, but this is a false address. Lufft, the printer of Luther's books, never had a printing press at Marburg.

Following the hostile reception of his work by Tunstall, Wolsey, and Thomas More in England, Tyndale retreated into hiding in Hamburg and continued working. He revised his New Testament and began translating the Old Testament and writing various treatises.

Opposition to Henry VIII's annulment
In 1530, he wrote The Practice of Prelates, opposing Henry VIII's desire to secure the annulment of his marriage to Catherine of Aragon in favour of Anne Boleyn, on the grounds that it was unscriptural and that it was a plot by Cardinal Wolsey to get Henry entangled in the papal courts of Pope Clement VII.  The king's wrath was aimed at Tyndale. Henry asked Emperor Charles V to have the writer apprehended and returned to England under the terms of the Treaty of Cambrai; however, the emperor responded that formal evidence was required before extradition. Tyndale developed his case in An Answer unto Sir Thomas More's Dialogue.

Betrayal and death
Eventually, Tyndale was betrayed by Henry Phillips to authorities representing the Holy Roman Empire. He was seized in Antwerp in 1535, and held in the castle of Vilvoorde (Filford) near Brussels. Some suspect that Phillips was hired by Bishop Stokesley to gain Tyndale's confidence and then betray him.

He was tried on a charge of heresy in 1536 and was found guilty and condemned to be burned to death, despite Thomas Cromwell's intercession on his behalf. Tyndale "was strangled to death while tied at the stake, and then his dead body was burned". His final words, spoken "at the stake with a fervent zeal, and a loud voice", were reported as "Lord! Open the King of England's eyes." The traditional date of commemoration is 6 October, but records of Tyndale's imprisonment suggest that the actual date of his execution might have been some weeks earlier. Foxe gives 6 October as the date of commemoration (left-hand date column), but gives no date of death (right-hand date column). Biographer David Daniell states his date of death only as "one of the first days of October 1536".

Within four years, four English translations of the Bible were published in England at the king's behest, including Henry's official Great Bible. All were based on Tyndale's work.

Theological views
Tyndale seems to have come out of the Lollard tradition, which was strong in Gloucestershire. Tyndale denounced the practice of prayer to saints. He also rejected the then-orthodox view that the scriptures could be interpreted only by approved clergy. While his views were influenced by Luther, Tyndale also deliberately distanced himself from the German reformer on several key theological points, adopting a symbolical interpretation of the Lord's Supper in opposition to Luther's doctrine of the real presence of Christ in the Eucharist.

Printed works
Although best known for his translation of the Bible, Tyndale was also an active writer and translator. As well as his focus on how religion should be lived, he had a focus on political issues.

Legacy

Impact on the English language
In translating the Bible, Tyndale introduced new words into the English language; many were subsequently used in the King James Bible, such as Passover (as the name for the Jewish holiday, Pesach or Pesah) and scapegoat. Coinage of the word atonement (a concatenation of the words 'At One' to describe Christ's work of restoring a good relationship—a reconciliation—between God and people) is also sometimes ascribed to Tyndale. However, the word was probably in use by at least 1513, before Tyndale's translation. Tyndale also introduced the term mercy seat into English, literally translating Luther's German Gnadenstuhl.  .

As well as individual words, Tyndale also coined such familiar phrases as:
 my brother's keeper
 knock and it shall be opened unto you
 a moment in time
 fashion not yourselves to the world
 seek and ye shall find
 ask and it shall be given you
 judge not that ye be not judged
 the word of God which liveth and lasteth forever
 let there be light 
 the powers that be
 the salt of the earth
 a law unto themselves
 it came to pass
 the signs of the times
 filthy lucre
 the spirit is willing, but the flesh is weak (which is like Luther's translation of Matthew 26,41: der Geist ist willig, aber das Fleisch ist schwach; Wycliffe for example translated it with: for the spirit is ready, but the flesh is sick.)
 live, move and have our being

Controversy over new words and phrases
The hierarchy of the Catholic Church did not approve of some of the words and phrases introduced by Tyndale, such as "overseer", where it would have been understood as "bishop", "elder" for "priest", and "love" rather than "charity". Tyndale, citing Erasmus, contended that the Greek New Testament did not support the traditional readings. More controversially, Tyndale translated the Greek ekklesia, (literally "called out ones") as "congregation" rather than "church". It has been asserted this translation choice "was a direct threat to the Church's ancient – but so Tyndale here made clear, non-scriptural – claim to be the body of Christ on earth. To change these words was to strip the Church hierarchy of its pretensions to be Christ's terrestrial representative, and to award this honor to individual worshipers who made up each congregation."

Tyndale was accused of translation errors. Thomas More commented that searching for errors in the Tyndale Bible was similar to searching for water in the sea and charged Tyndale's translation of The Obedience of a Christian Man with having about a thousand false translations. Bishop Tunstall of London declared that there were upwards of 2,000 errors in Tyndale's Bible, having already in 1523 denied Tyndale the permission required under the Constitutions of Oxford (1409), which were still in force, to translate the Bible into English. In response to allegations of inaccuracies in his translation in the New Testament, Tyndale in the Prologue to his 1525 translation wrote that he never intentionally altered or misrepresented any of the Bible but that he had sought to "interpret the sense of the scripture and the meaning of the spirit."

While translating, Tyndale followed Erasmus's 1522 Greek edition of the New Testament. In his preface to his 1534 New Testament ("WT unto the Reader"), he not only goes into some detail about the Greek tenses but also points out that there is often a Hebrew idiom underlying the Greek. The Tyndale Society adduces much further evidence to show that his translations were made directly from the original Hebrew and Greek sources he had at his disposal. For example, the Prolegomena in Mombert's William Tyndale's Five Books of Moses show that Tyndale's Pentateuch is a translation of the Hebrew original. His translation also drew on the Latin Vulgate and Luther's 1521 September Testament.

Of the first (1526) edition of Tyndale's New Testament, only three copies survive. The only complete copy is part of the Bible Collection of Württembergische Landesbibliothek, Stuttgart. The copy of the British Library is almost complete, lacking only the title page and list of contents. Another rarity is Tyndale's Pentateuch, of which only nine remain.

Impact on English Bibles
The translators of the Revised Standard Version in the 1940s noted that Tyndale's translation, including the 1537 Matthew Bible, inspired the translations that followed: The Great Bible of 1539; the Geneva Bible of 1560; the Bishops' Bible of 1568; the Douay-Rheims Bible of 1582–1609; and the King James Version of 1611, of which the RSV translators noted: "It [the KJV] kept felicitous phrases and apt expressions, from whatever source, which had stood the test of public usage. It owed most, especially in the New Testament, to Tyndale".

Brian Moynahan writes: "A complete analysis of the Authorised Version, known down the generations as 'the AV' or 'the King James', was made in 1998. It shows that Tyndale's words account for 84% of the New Testament and for 75.8% of the Old Testament books that he translated." Joan Bridgman comments on the Contemporary Review that, "He [Tyndale] is the mainly unrecognized translator of the most influential book in the world. Although the Authorised King James Version is ostensibly the production of a learned committee of churchmen, it is mostly cribbed from Tyndale with some reworking of his translation."

Many of the English versions since then have drawn inspiration from Tyndale, such as the Revised Standard Version, the New American Standard Bible, and the English Standard Version. Even the paraphrases like the Living Bible have been inspired by the same desire to make the Bible understandable to Tyndale's proverbial plowboy.

George Steiner in his book on translation After Babel refers to "the influence of the genius of Tyndale, the greatest of English Bible translators." He has also appeared as a character in two plays dealing with the King James Bible, Howard Brenton's Anne Boleyn (2010) and David Edgar's Written on the Heart (2011).

Memorials

A memorial to Tyndale stands in Vilvoorde, Flanders, where he was executed. It was erected in 1913 by Friends of the Trinitarian Bible Society of London and the Belgian Bible Society. There is also a small William Tyndale Museum in the town, attached to the Protestant church. A bronze statue by Sir Joseph Boehm commemorating the life and work of Tyndale was erected in Victoria Embankment Gardens on the Thames Embankment, London, in 1884. It shows his right hand on an open Bible, which is itself resting on an early printing press. A life-sized bronze statue of a seated William Tyndale at work on his translation by Lawrence Holofcener (2000) was placed in the Millennium Square, Bristol, United Kingdom.

The Tyndale Monument was built in 1866 on a hill above his supposed birthplace, North Nibley, Gloucestershire. A stained-glass window commemorating Tyndale was made in 1911 for the British and Foreign Bible Society by James Powell and Sons. In 1994, after the Society had moved their offices from London to Swindon, the window was reinstalled in the chapel of Hertford College in Oxford. Tyndale was at Magdalen Hall, Oxford, which became Hertford College in 1874. The window depicts a full-length portrait of Tyndale, a cameo of a printing shop in action, some words of Tyndale, the opening words of Genesis in Hebrew, the opening words of John's Gospel in Greek, and the names of other pioneering Bible translators. The portrait is based on the oil painting that hangs in the college's dining hall.  A stained glass window by Arnold Robinson in Tyndale Baptist Church, Bristol, also commemorates the life of Tyndale.

Several colleges, schools and study centres have been named in his honour, including Tyndale House (Cambridge), Tyndale University (Toronto), the Tyndale-Carey Graduate School affiliated to the Bible College of New Zealand, William Tyndale College (Farmington Hills, Michigan), and Tyndale Theological Seminary (Shreveport, Louisiana, and Fort Worth, Texas), the independent Tyndale Theological Seminary in Badhoevedorp, near Amsterdam, The Netherlands, Tyndale Christian School in South Australia and Tyndale Park Christian School in New Zealand. An American Christian publishing house, also called Tyndale House, was named after Tyndale.

There is an Anglican communion setting in memoriam William Tyndale, The Tyndale Service, by David Mitchell.

Liturgical commemoration
By tradition Tyndale's death is commemorated on 6 October. There are commemorations on this date in the church calendars of members of the Anglican Communion, initially as one of the "days of optional devotion" in the American Book of Common Prayer (1979), and a "black-letter day" in the Church of England's Alternative Service Book. The Common Worship that came into use in the Church of England in 2000 provides a collect proper to 6 October (Lesser Festival), beginning with the words:

Tyndale is honored in the Calendar of saints of the Evangelical Lutheran Church in America as a translator and martyr the same day.

Works about Tyndale

The first biographical film about Tyndale, titled William Tindale, was released in 1937. Arnold Wathen Robinson depicted Tyndale's life in stained glass windows for the Tyndale Baptist Church ca. 1955. The 1975 novel The Hawk that Dare Not Hunt by Day by Scott O'Dell fictionalizes Tyndale and the smuggling of his Bible into England. The film God's Outlaw: The Story of William Tyndale, was released in 1986. The 1998 film Stephen's Test of Faith includes a long scene with Tyndale, how he translated the Bible, and how he was put to death.

A cartoon film about his life, titled Torchlighters: The William Tyndale Story, was released ca. 2005. The documentary film, William Tyndale: Man with a Mission, was released ca. 2005. The movie included an interview with David Daniell. In 2007, the 2-hour Channel 4 documentary, The Bible Revolution, presented by Rod Liddle, details the roles of historically significant English Reformers John Wycliffe, William Tyndale, and Thomas Cranmer. The "Battle for the Bible" (2007) episode of the PBS Secrets of the Dead series, narrated by Liev Schreiber, features Tyndale's story and legacy and includes historical context. This film is an abbreviated and revised version of the PBS/Channel 4 version.

In 2011, BYUtv produced a documentary miniseries, Fires of Faith, on the creation of the King James Bible, which focused heavily on Tyndale's life. In 2013, BBC Two aired a 60-minute documentary The Most Dangerous Man in Tudor England, written and presented by Melvyn Bragg.

Another known documentary is the film William Tyndale: His Life, His Legacy.

Tyndale's pronunciation
Tyndale was writing at the beginning of the Early Modern English period. His pronunciation must have differed in its phonology from that of Shakespeare at the end of the period. In 2013 linguist David Crystal made a transcription and a sound recording of Tyndale's translation of the whole of the Gospel of Matthew in what he believes to be the pronunciation of the day, using the term "original pronunciation". The recording has been published by The British Library on two compact discs with an introductory essay by Crystal.

See also

Luther Bible
Textus Receptus

References

Notes

Citations

Sources

 

 

 .

 .
 .
 , 
 
 
 

 .

 

 

 
 
 
 
 
 .
 

 

 .

 .
 

Attribution:

Further reading

 
 . The online version corrects the name of Tyndale's Antwerp landlord as "Thomas Pointz" vice the "Henry Pointz" indicated in the print.

External links

 
 .
 
 .
 
 The Tyndale Society.
 
 
 
 William Tyndale's Bible
 https://tyndalebible.com/ 

1490s births
1536 deaths
15th-century Christian biblical scholars
16th-century Christian biblical scholars
16th-century English clergy
16th-century English Roman Catholic priests
16th-century English translators
Alumni of Magdalen Hall, Oxford
Anglican saints
British translation scholars
Christian humanists
Deaths by strangulation
English biblical scholars
English people martyred elsewhere
Executed people from Gloucestershire
 People celebrated in the Lutheran liturgical calendar
 People educated at Magdalen College School, Oxford
 People educated at Katharine Lady Berkeley's School
 People executed for heresy
 People from Stroud District
 People from Vilvoorde
 Translators of the Bible into English
 Year of birth unknown